Kailey Willis (born 18 May 2003) is a Maltese footballer who plays as a forward for Italian Serie A club Hellas Verona Women and the Malta women's national team.

Club career
Willis has played for Tarxien Rainbows FC and Birkirkara FC in Malta and for Hellas Verona in Italy.

International career
Willis made her senior debut for Malta on 10 June 2021.

References

2003 births
Living people
Maltese women's footballers
Women's association football forwards
Birkirkara F.C. (women) players
Hellas Verona Women players
Serie A (women's football) players
Malta women's youth international footballers
Malta women's international footballers
Maltese expatriate footballers
Maltese expatriate sportspeople in Italy
Expatriate women's footballers in Italy